Tom Kierey  (born 4 September 1994) is a German paracanoeist. He silver medalled at the 2016 Summer Paralympics in the Men's KL3.

References

External links
 
 
 

1994 births
Living people
Sportspeople from Dresden
German male canoeists
Paracanoeists of Germany
Paralympic medalists in paracanoe
Paralympic silver medalists for Germany
Paracanoeists at the 2016 Summer Paralympics
Medalists at the 2016 Summer Paralympics
ICF Canoe Sprint World Championships medalists in paracanoe
21st-century German people